"Eriocottis euryphracta" is a moth of the family Yponomeutidae. It is found in Australia. Research has concluded it does not belong in the genus Eriocottis (which belongs to the family Eriocottidae), but it has not been moved to another genus yet.

External links
Australian Faunal Directory

Yponomeutidae